Macerata Feltria is a comune (municipality) in the Province of Pesaro e Urbino in the Italian region Marche, located about  west of Ancona and about  southwest of Pesaro.

Macerata Feltria borders the following municipalities: Lunano, Monte Cerignone, Montecopiolo, Monte Grimano, Piandimeleto, Pietrarubbia, Sassocorvaro Auditore.

History

During the  Roman Empire, Macerata Feltria  was known as Pitinum Pisaurense; it was a small town built in the place of an old Celtic village (in that area the Senones Celts were settled). Its economy was based on the export of wood.

During the 6th century AD, Pitinum Pisaurense was completely destroyed by the Ostrogoths during the Gothic War (535-554).
After the year 1000 AD the village was rebuilt using the ruins of the old Pitinum Pisaurense; in facts, the name Macerata means "built with the ruins".

In the late Middle Ages, the village was a fief of the Malatesta family, as part of the Papal States.
After the end of World War II half the population emigrated, mainly to Genoa.

In the village there is an archeological museum, exposing the evidences of the village history.

References

External links
 Official website

Cities and towns in the Marche